Zoey Berry (born 1 October 1987) is a former New Zealand rugby union player. She played 12 years of representative rugby for Canterbury. She made her only appearance for New Zealand on 27 November 2012 against England at Aldershot.

In 2018, Berry was one of four rugby players sanctioned by New Zealand Rugby for doping offences.

References

External links 

 Black Ferns Profile

1987 births
Living people
New Zealand female rugby union players
New Zealand women's international rugby union players